William Gould (May 2, 1886 – May 15, 1969) was a Canadian-American film actor. He appeared in more than 240 films during his career. In films, Gould portrayed Jed Scott, a leader of homesteaders, in the serial The Lone Ranger Rides Again (1939) and Air Marshal Kragg in the serial Buck Rogers (1939).

Selected filmography

Saved by Radio (1922) - Spike Jones
 Back Fire (1922) - Steve Rollins
Beasts of Paradise (1923)
Flirting with Love (1924) - John Williams
The Desert Outlaw (1924)
Pride of Sunshine Alley (1924)
The Red Lily (1924) - Arresting Detective (uncredited)
The Riddle Rider (1924) - Jack Archer
The Sunrise Trail (1931) - Joe - Card Player (uncredited)
Heroes of the Flames (1931) - John Madison
The Phantom (1931) - Dr. Weldon
The Crowd Roars (1932) - Track Doctor (uncredited)
Uptown New York (1932) - Police Desk Sergeant (uncredited)
The Lost Special (1932, Serial) - Steele [Ch. 1] (uncredited)
Phantom Thunderbolt (1933) - Red Matthews
The Trail Drive (1933) - Honest John
Gun Justice (1933) - Jones
The Richest Girl in the World (1934) (uncredited)
Loser's End (1935)
 Swifty (1935)
 Desert Guns (1936)
Chatterbox (1936)
Shakedown (1936)
Ranger Courage (1936)
The Unknown Ranger (1936)
 Desert Justice (1936)
Wild Horse Rodeo (1937) - Harkley
Hoosier Schoolboy (1937) - John Matthew, Sr.
Prescription for Romance (1937)
The Purple Vigilantes (1938)
The Gladiator (1938) (uncredited)
Mr. Wong, Detective (1938)
The Lone Ranger Rides Again (1939)
Buck Rogers (1939)
Nancy Drew and the Hidden Staircase (1939)
Dr. Christian Meets the Women (1940)
 Lightning Strikes West (1940)
 Nobody's Children (1940)
The Man Who Lost Himself (1941)
Never Give a Sucker an Even Break (1941) (uncredited)
Saboteur (1942) - Stranger on Sidewalk (uncredited)
 Tramp, Tramp, Tramp (1942)
Saddle Leather Law (1944)
Messenger of Peace (1947)
 Lady at Midnight (1948)
 Guns of the Timberland (1960) - Dr. Evans (uncredited)
 Wakakute warukute sugoi koitsura (1962) - O. H. Smith

Television
Appeared in a 1950 TV episode of The Lone Ranger entitled "Buried Treasure (1950)

References

External links

1886 births
1969 deaths
American male film actors
American male silent film actors
20th-century American male actors
Canadian emigrants to the United States